There have been two baronetcies created for persons with the surname Rushout, one in the Baronetage of England and one in the Baronetage of the United Kingdom. Both creations are extinct.

The Rushout Baronetcy, of Milnst in the County of Essex, was created in the Baronetage of England on 17 June 1661. The fifth Baronet was elevated to the peerage as Baron Northwick in 1797. For more information on this creation, see this article.

The Cockerell, later Rushout Baronetcy, of Sezincote in the County of Gloucester, was created in the Baronetage of the United Kingdom on 25 September 1809 for Charles Cockerell, Member of Parliament for Tregony, Lostwithiel, Bletchingley, Seaford and Evesham. He married as his second wife Harriet, daughter of John Rushout, 1st Baron Northwick (see above). Their son, Sir Charles Rushout Cockerell, 2nd Baronet, assumed by Royal licence the surname of Rushout in lieu of his patronymic in 1849. He served as High Sheriff of Gloucestershire in 1856. The title became extinct on the death of his grandson, the fourth Baronet, in 1931.

The family seat of the Cockerell, later Rushout family, was Sezincote House, near Moreton-in-Marsh. Gloucestershire. The house was designed by Samuel Pepys Cockerell, brother of the first Baronet.

Rushout baronets, of Milnst (1661)
see Baron Northwick

Cockerell, later Rushout baronets, of Sezincote (1809)
Sir Charles Cockerell, 1st Baronet (died 1837)
Sir Charles Rushout Rushout, 2nd Baronet (1809–1869)
Sir Charles Fitzgerald Rushout, 3rd Baronet (1840–1879)
Sir Charles Hamilton Rushout, 4th Baronet (1868–1931)

References

Extinct baronetcies in the Baronetage of England
Extinct baronetcies in the Baronetage of the United Kingdom
1661 establishments in England